"Parachute" is a song by Nigerian-born Australian singer-songwriter and dancer Timomatic. It was released as a digital download in Australia on 5 June 2013. The song peaked at number three on the ARIA Singles Chart and was certified two times platinum by the Australian Recording Industry Association. 

"Parachute" and its accompanying music video were nominated at the 2013 ARIA Music Awards for Song of the Year and Best Video.

Background
"Parachute" was written by Teddy Sky, Johnny Powers, Ameerah Roelants and Jimmy Thornfeldt. Timomatic recorded the single in Los Angeles with producer Johnny Powers. Timomatic and Powers had penned two tracks together before Powers, part of super producer RedOne's team of hitmakers, played him "Parachute". Timomatic said, "I wanted that track, it's my sound, it's perfect." When speaking about the song, he said: "When the emotion is real, it's easy to sing about, easy to write about, easy to be inspired. The song is about a guy having complete trust in his other half to jump into any situation and know you're going to be OK is a big thing, a very big thing."

"Parachute" was released digitally on 5 June 2013.

Promotion
The music video for "Parachute" was directed by Marc Furmie and Elisa Mercurio, and released onto YouTube on 19 June 2013. The video was nominated for Best Video at the 2013 ARIA Music Awards. Timomatic performed "Parachute" for the first time at the 2013 State of Origin game one, held at ANZ Stadium in Sydney on 5 June." He then went on to perform "Parachute" on the final of ''The Block Australia Sky High.

Track listings

Charts

Weekly charts

Year-end charts

Certifications

Release history

References

2013 songs
2013 singles
Timomatic songs
Sony Music Australia singles
Songs written by Jimmy Thörnfeldt
Songs written by Ameerah (singer)